Bajada de línea was an Argentine TV program hosted by Víctor Hugo Morales.

Nominations

 2013 Martín Fierro Awards
 Best journalism program

References

El Nueve original programming
2010 Argentine television series debuts
Kirchnerism